Kurgeh or Koorgeh may refer to:
 Kurgeh, Kerman
 Kurgeh, West Azerbaijan